Antoinette (French: Conduisez-moi, Madame) is a 1932 French comedy film directed by Herbert Selpin and starring Jeanne Boitel, Armand Bernard and Nadine Picard. It is a remake of the German film Chauffeur Antoinette which was also directed by Selpin. A British version The Love Contract was also produced the same year.

Synopsis
After she loses her money through financial investment, a wealthy widow takes a job as a chauffeur for the speculator responsible for her losses. He promises her that if she is a perfect driver for three months he will restore her former estate to her, but throws a number of obstacles in her path.

Cast
 Jeanne Boitel as 	Antoinette
 Armand Bernard as 	Émile
 Nadine Picard as Véra de Saurin
 Rolla Norman as André Réville
 Pierre Magnier as 	Le baron Georges
 Georgé as 	Pierre
 Jacques Varennes as 	M. de Saurin
 Henry Bonvallet as M. Dorman
 Jean Sorbier	
 Lise Elina	
 Manou

References

Bibliography 
 Crisp, Colin. Genre, Myth and Convention in the French Cinema, 1929-1939. Indiana University Press, 2002.

External links 
 

1932 films
1930s French-language films
Films directed by Herbert Selpin
French black-and-white films
1930s French films
1932 comedy films
French comedy films
Gaumont Film Company films

fr:Conduisez-moi Madame